The 1917 Haskell Indians football team was an American football team that represented the Haskell Indian Institute (now known as Haskell Indian Nations University) as an independent during the 1917 college football season. In its first and only season under head coach Antonio Lubo, Haskell compiled a 6–5 record. "Pep" Black was the team captain.

Schedule

References

Haskell
Haskell Indian Nations Fighting Indians football seasons
Haskell Indians football